Mykhaylo Meskhi (born 26 February 1997 in Donetsk, Ukraine) is a professional Ukrainian football midfielder of Georgian descents, who plays for Kecskemét.

Career
Meskhi is a product of the youth team system of present-day defunct FC Metalurh from his native city Donetsk.

From 2015 he plays for FC Stal Kamianske and made his debut for FC Stal in the game against FC Shakhtar Donetsk on 4 December 2016 in the Ukrainian Premier League.

On 13 July 2018 he signed a contract to Hungarian first division team Mezőkövesdi SE.

References

External links
 

1997 births
Living people
Footballers from Donetsk
Ukrainian footballers
Association football midfielders
FC Metalurh Donetsk players
FC Stal Kamianske players
Mezőkövesdi SE footballers
FC Mynai players
Kecskeméti TE players
Ukrainian Premier League players
Nemzeti Bajnokság I players
Ukrainian expatriate footballers
Expatriate footballers in Hungary
Ukrainian expatriate sportspeople in Hungary